Sven Thomas Hanzon (born 20 June 1962) is a Swedish actor and stage actor at the Royal Dramatic Theatre in Stockholm and former footballer. He was born in 1962 in Stockholm, Sweden. He worked with Ingmar Bergman in both movies and on stage. He has two children with Swedish actress Lena Endre and is now married to Åsa Hultman and living in Stockholm.

Early years
Hanzon played football for Djurgårdens IF. He made his senior debut in the derby against Hammarby IF at the age of 17. He also played on the Swedish youth national team. He left a promising career as a professional football player to pursue an acting career.

Hanzon, with several others, started the theatre group Theater Cameleont in 1982. The group later became Club Cameleont. He wrote A Joker in the Game on behalf of the Swedish Church.

Hanzon was discovered by a producer from the Stockholm City Theater. He made his debut in 1985 in Arnold. He remained with the theater for several years and received most of his acting education there. He did not stay at the theater due to his lack of formal education, and then became involved in drama.

Hanzon made his film debut in 1987 in Colin Nutley movie Nioende Kompaniet. He made his TV debut in 1987 on Swedish Television Drama in Stieg Trenter's series "Lysande Landning". Ingmar Bergman directed Hanzon in the TV production "Private Confessions". He played in the Bergman movie Trolösa in 2000, directed by Liv Ullmann. The movie won several honours, including the Festival Award Jury's Special Prize in Belgium.

Hanzon joined the Royal Dramatic Theatre where he had his first role as the young Danceny in Dangerous Liaisons, and he has been part of the permanent ensemble ever since.

The Royal Dramatic Theatre
With the Royal Dramatic Theatre Hanzon has collaborated in multiple productions with the director Ingmar Bergman. He has also collaborated with directors , Tommy Bergren, and Arthur Miller. He has also worked with Lars Norén and Robert Lepage. With the Royal Dramatic Theatre he collaborated with Peter Birros in "The tenderness I value", directed by Stefan Larsson, in 2008, and in Yasmina Reza's "God of the massacre", directed by Staffan Roos, in 2009.

Selected filmography
1987 – Nionde kompaniet (Ninth Company)
1994 – Leken
1994 – Yrrol
1995 – Älskar, älskar inte (Alskar Does Not Love)
1997 – Tic Tac
1998 – Mighty Joe Young (voice as Gregory O'Hara)
1999 – Vägen ut
2000 – Hassel – Förgörarna
2000 – Trolösa
2000 – Livet är en schlager
2000 – The Little Mermaid 2 (voice as Eric)
2001 – Det största i världen
2002 – Beck – Sista vittnet
2005 – Van Veeteren – Borkmanns punkt
2005 – Van Veeteren – Münsters fall
2005 – Van Veeteren – Carambole
2006 – Van Veeteren – Svalan, Katten, Rosen, Döden
2006 – Van Veeteren – Fallet G as Münster
2007 – Underbar och älskad av alla (Wonderful and Loved by Everyone)
2011 – Jag saknar dig as Albert
2014 – Medicinen (Medicine) as Magnus
2015 – Sverige år fantastiskt (Sverige er fantastisk) as Svend-Erik
2015 – Dödsdansen - generalrepetitionen (The Dance of Death - General Rehearsal)
2015 – Så ock på Jorden (Heaven on Earth) as Bruno
2016 – Jag älskar dig - en skilsmässokomedi (I Love You - A Divorce Comedy) as Nils
2016 – Krigarnas ö (The Name of the Game) as Police

TV theatre, TV series selected
1987 – Lysande landning
1989 – Tiger Rag
1990 – Destination Nordsjön (Destination North Sea)
1996 – Anna Holt – polis
1996 – Ett sorts Hades
1996 – Enskilda samtal
1996 – Zonen
1999 – Personkrets 3:1
2002 – Pappa polis
2003 – Solisterna
2003 – Vera med flera
2005 – Livet enligt Rosa
2005 – Wallander as Zoran
2006 – Ørnen: En krimi-odyssé (The Eagle) as Patrik
2007 – Leende guldbruna ögon (Golden Brown Eyes) as Hasse Manheimer
2007 – Der Kommissar und das Meer (The Inspector and the Sea) as Kristian Norström
2007 – Kodenavn Hunter as Göran
2008 – Häxdansen as Patrik
2008 – Livvagterne (The Protectors) as Gabriel Magnusson
2008 – Livet i Fagervik as Jörgen Wikman
2012 – Hellfjord as Bosse Nova
2013 – Morden i Sandhamn - den innersta kretsen (The Sandhamn Murders) as Ingmar
2013 – Maria Wern - Drömmen förde dig vilse (Maria Wern) as Anders
2014 – Portkod 1525 
2018 – Der Kommissar und das Meer
2019 – Das Mädchen am Strand
2020 – Agent Hamilton

Theatre

Audiobooks (selection)
2020 – Flowers over hell by Ilaria Tuti 
2020 – Unhappy in Paradise by Christian Rück 
2020 – Edward Finnigans restoration by Anders Roslund and Börge Hellström
2020 – Sleep Tight by Anders Roslund 
2019 – Box 21 by Anders Roslund and Börge Hellström
2019 – Moratorium by Monica Rehn
2019 – Dark Powers by Torsten Bengtsson
2019 – Unlikely reasons by Hannes Dükler
2019 – Happy Birthday! by Anders Roslund
2018 – The Phenomenon Ingvar Kamprad by Anders Ström
2018 – The chef that got out of his room by Nicolas Jaquenout
2018 – The Beast by Anders Roslund and Stefan Thunberg
2017 – Exit West by Mosin Hamid
2017 – A brother to die for by Anders Roslund and Börge Hellström 
2016 – Three minutes by Anders Roslund and Börge Hellström
2019 – The Bear Dance by Anders Roslund and Stefan Thunberg

Prize and distinction 
 1998 – George hatt- for People cirkel 3:1
 2012 – Gunn Wållgren Award
 2015 – Daniel Engdahls-award

Jury work 
Thomas Hanzon has been in many different juries for film awards.

 "Risings Star" on Stockholm International Film Festival 2015
 "Best Female Actress" on Internationell Emmy Awards 2016
 Head Jury, XXIX Stockholm Competition on Stockholm International Film Festival 2018

References

External links

1962 births
Living people
Swedish male film actors
Swedish footballers
Djurgårdens IF Fotboll players
Allsvenskan players
Swedish male television actors
20th-century Swedish male actors
21st-century Swedish male actors
Association footballers not categorized by position